A bookmarklet is a bookmark stored in a web browser that contains JavaScript commands that add new features to the browser. They are stored as the URL of a bookmark in a web browser or as a hyperlink on a web page. Bookmarklets are usually small snippets of JavaScript executed when user clicks on them. When clicked, bookmarklets can perform a wide variety of operations, such as running a search query from selected text or extracting data from a table.

Another name for bookmarklet is favelet or favlet, derived from favorites (synonym of bookmark).

History 

Steve Kangas of bookmarklets.com coined the word bookmarklet when he started to create short scripts based on a suggestion in Netscape's JavaScript guide. Before that, Tantek Çelik called these scripts favelets and used that word as early as on 6 September 2001 (personal email). Brendan Eich, who developed JavaScript at Netscape, gave this account of the origin of bookmarklets:

The increased implementation of Content Security Policy (CSP) in websites has caused problems with bookmarklet execution and usage (2013-2015), with some suggesting that this hails the end or death of bookmarklets. William Donnelly created a work-around solution for this problem (in the specific instance of loading, referencing and using JavaScript library code) in early 2015 using a Greasemonkey userscript (Firefox / Pale Moon browser add-on extension) and a simple bookmarklet-userscript communication protocol. It allows (library-based) bookmarklets to be executed on any and all websites, including those using CSP and having an https:// URI scheme. Note, however, that if/when browsers support disabling/disallowing inline script execution using CSP, and if/when websites begin to implement that feature, it will "break" this "fix".

Concept 

Web browsers use URIs for the href attribute of the <a> tag and for bookmarks.  The URI scheme, such as http:, file:, or ftp:, specifies the protocol and the format for the rest of the string.  Browsers also implement a prefix javascript: that to a parser is just like any other URI. Internally, the browser sees that the specified protocol is javascript, treats the rest of the string as a JavaScript application which is then executed, and uses the resulting string as the new page.

The executing script has access to the current page, which it may inspect and change. If the script returns an undefined type (rather than, for example, a string), the browser will not load a new page, with the result that the script simply runs against the current page content. This permits changes such as in-place font size and color changes without a page reload.

An anonymous function that does not return a value, define a function, etc., can be used to force the script to return an undefined type:
javascript:(function(s){
  //Statements returning a non-undefined type, e.g. assignments
})();
However, if a script includes a function definition/redefinition, such as function Use_this_globally(){...}, the environment will not be populated with it. For this reason an {arbitrary script} should be wrapped in void(...);.
javascript:void({arbitrary script});

Usage 

Bookmarklets are saved and used as normal bookmarks. As such, they are simple "one-click" tools which add functionality to the browser. For example, they can:

 Modify the appearance of a web page within the browser (e.g., change font size, background color, etc.)
 Extract data from a web page (e.g., hyperlinks, images, text, etc.)
 Remove redirects from (e.g. Google) search results, to show the actual target URL 
 Submit the current page to a blogging service such as Posterous, link-shortening service such as bit.ly, or bookmarking service such as Delicious
 Query a search engine or online encyclopedia with highlighted text or by a dialog box
 Submit the current page to a link validation service or translation service
 Set commonly chosen configuration options when the page itself provides no way to do this
 Control HTML5 audio and video playback parameters such as speed, position, toggling looping, and showing/hiding playback controls, the first of which can be adjusted beyond HTML5 players' typical range setting.

Installation

"Installation" of a bookmarklet is performed by creating a new bookmark, and pasting the code into the URL destination field. Alternatively, if the bookmarklet is presented as a link, under some browsers it can be dragged and dropped onto the bookmark bar. The bookmarklet can then be run by loading the bookmark normally.

Example
This example bookmarklet performs a Wikipedia search on any highlighted text in the web browser window. In normal use, the following JavaScript code would be installed to a bookmark in a browser bookmarks toolbar. From then on, after selecting any text, clicking the bookmarklet performs the search.
javascript:(function(document) {
function se(d) {
    return d.selection ? d.selection.createRange(1).text : d.getSelection(1);
}; 
let d = se(document); 
for (i=0; i<frames.length && (d==document || d=='document'); i++) d = se(frames[i].document); 
if (d=='document') d = prompt('Enter%20search%20terms%20for%20Wikipedia',''); 
open('https://en.wikipedia.org' + (d ? '/w/index.php?title=Special:Search&search=' + encodeURIComponent(d) : '')).focus();
})(document);

References

External links 

 

JavaScript
Web development